Sušje is a village in the Municipality of Ribnica in southern Slovenia. The area is part of the traditional region of Lower Carniola and is now included in the Southeast Slovenia Statistical Region.

There is a small roadside chapel-shrine in the settlement, dedicated to the Our Lady of Lourdes. It was built in the late 19th century in the Neo-Gothic style.

References

External links
Sušje on Geopedia

Populated places in the Municipality of Ribnica